Speed skating at the 2010 Winter Olympics was held at the Richmond Olympic Oval, Richmond, British Columbia, between 13 and 27 February 2010.

Notes 
Haralds Silovs became the first athlete in Olympic history to participate in both short track (1500 m) and long track (5000 m) speed skating, and the first to compete in two different disciplines on the same day. He competed in the 5000 m and then raced across town to the 1500 m event. The low altitude of Vancouver and high humidity inside the Richmond Olympic Oval, set just 3 metres above the sea, contributed to the fact that no world records in speed skating were set at these Games.

Medal summary

Medal table

Men's events 

* Skaters who did not participate in the final, but received medals.

Women's events 

* Skater who did not participate in the final, but received a medal.

Events 
A total of twelve speed skating events were held at Vancouver 2010:

Competition schedule 
All times are Pacific Standard Time (UTC-8).

Qualification times

Participating nations
A total of 177 athletes from 24 nations participated (the numbers of athletes are shown in parentheses).

References

External links 
 Qualification System
 Qualification times
 Vancouver 2010 Olympic Winter Games Competition Schedule v12

 
2010
2010 Winter Olympics events
O
Olympics, 2010